Grevillea involucrata, also known as Lake Varley grevillea, is a species of flowering plant in the family Proteaceae and is endemic to the south-west of Western Australia. It is an openly-branched, prostrate or low-lying shrub with divided leaves with parallel, oblong to linear lobes, and pink flowers with a pinkish-red style.

Description
The edges of the leaflets are rolled under, enclosing most of the lower surface. The flowers are pale to dark pink with a reddish-pink style.

Taxonomy
Grevillea involucrata was first formally in 1974 by botanist Alex George in the journal Nuytsia, based on plant material he collected between Hyden and Lake Varley in 1970. The specific epithet (involucrata) means "having leaves or bracts surrounding the base of the flowers".

Distribution and habitat
Lake Varley grevillea grows in low, open shrubland in scattered location between Lake Grace, Hyden, Holt Rock and Lake Magenta in the Mallee bioregion of south-western Western Australia.

Conservation status
Grevillea involulacrata is listed as "threatened" by the Western Australian Government Department of Biodiversity, Conservation and Attractions, meaning that it is in danger of extinction.

References

involucrata
Eudicots of Western Australia
Proteales of Australia
Plants described in 1974
Taxa named by Alex George